Bruce Everitt Lindahl (January 29, 1953 – April 4, 1981) was an American serial killer and rapist who committed a series of rapes and murders in the late 1970s and early 1980s. In 2020, 39 years after his death, on the basis of DNA profiling, Lindahl was connected to the death of 16-year-old Pamela Maurer, who was killed on January 13, 1976, in DuPage County, Illinois. 

He has been declared a suspect in at least 12 murders and 9 rapes committed in different Chicago suburbs from 1974 to 1981, which are currently being investigated. In total, over 70 girls and women were killed during the indicated time period, both in DuPage and the surrounding counties.

Biography 
Bruce Lindahl was born on January 29, 1953, in St. Charles, Illinois, to Jerome and Arlene Lindahl. He attended college and graduated in the mid-1970s with a degree in electromechanics. The next few years, he worked as an electrician, while studying additionally at the Midvalley Vocational Center in Kaneville. In his free time, Lindahl was fond of parachuting and racquetball, with his friends and acquaintances speaking extremely positively of him, despite the fact that he easily fell into states of irresistible impulses and occasionally showed aggressive behavior towards others. In December 1976, he was arrested for possession of marijuana, but  did not appear to be drug-addicted.

Crime spree 
Since 1974, Lindahl committed many minor offenses and was repeatedly arrested, but each time, the court gave him only fines. During this time period, he changed residences on several occasions. Over the years, he lived in Chicago and its various suburbs, before moving to Aurora in 1978. On March 6, 1979, on the pretext of selling marijuana, Lindahl lured 20-year-old Annette Lazar into his Aurora home, where he raped her under the threat of a gun. He later released her after she gave him consent to continue further intimate relationships, after which Lazar contacted the police. However, since she was a drug addict, and the house where she was raped belonged to a police officer Dave Torres, who was a friend of Lindahl, her testimony was reportedly discounted and Lindahl was not charged.

On June 23, 1980, Lindahl abducted 25-year-old Debra Colliander from the parking lot of a shopping center in Aurora. He took her to his apartment, where he raped Colliander before releasing her. She notified police, and this time, he was arrested and charged. However, Lindahl paid his bail and was released. On October 7, Debra Colliander went missing after leaving work, and the trial, which was supposed to take place in 1981, was canceled, due to the absence of the key witness. Subsequently, all charges were dropped.

On December 22, Lindahl attacked a 30-year-old woman in northern Aurora, after she refused to provide him with sexual services in exchange for money. Since there were several witnesses, Lindahl hurried to leave the scene without causing serious harm to the victim. The injured woman contacted police, and during the interrogation was presented with photographs of various criminals for visual identification. As Lindahl was not among them, the victim instead picked out another man with a similar appearance.

On January 28, 1981, Lindahl was convicted of illegally tapping and recording other people's phone calls to extort them. While they were trying to detain him, he attacked a police officer. After his arrest, he was charged with resisting arrest, illegal possession of weapons, and assault, but was again released on bail, and remained free during the preliminary investigation.

On an unspecified date, Lindahl was driving when he was pulled over by the police. The police discovered an unconscious woman bleeding from a deep gash in her head. They asked him what he was doing and he claimed that he was taking her to the hospital, although he was going in the wrong direction. An ambulance took the woman to the hospital, where an examination revealed she had been sexually assaulted. The woman stated that she did not remember what happened after Lindahl gave her a sip of something at a party. No charges were ever filed.

Murder of Charles Huber and death 
On April 4, 1981, while cruising around in one of the shopping and entertainment districts of Naperville, Lindahl met 18-year-old Charles Huber. After playing some ten-pin bowling together, Lindahl  suggested that they to go to his girlfriend's house and drink alcohol, to which Huber  agreed. That same evening, when they arrived in the apartment, Lindahl attacked Huber with a knife, stabbing him a total of 28 times. During the attack, however, Charles resisted, causing Lindahl to stab himself in the thigh, severing his own  femoral artery. This resulted in heavy bleeding, from which Lindahl, aged 28, died, right beside his deceased victim.

Subsequent events 
After Lindahl's death, one of his would-be victims contacted the authorities and identified him as her attacker. While inspecting his apartment, several photographs of young girls were located, including one that might be that of 16-year-old Deborah McCall, a Downers Grove resident who went missing in November 1979. The investigators suspected that Lindahl was involved in her disappearance, but McCall's body hasn't been located to this day.

In 1982, the decomposing body of Debra Colliander, who had been missing since October 7, 1980, was located. Soon after, a man contacted the Aurora police, claiming that Bruce had offered him a monetary reward in exchange for killing Colliander, to prevent her from testifying at trial, which led investigators to place him as the prime suspect, as Lindahl had a clear motive to commit the murder.

In 1993, the criminal case of 16-year-old Pamela Maurer, who was killed in January 1976, resumed. The girl was raped before death, and the criminal's biological traces were found and the DNA isolated. Using public genealogy sites, it was revealed that the killer's DNA matched with one of Lindahl's relatives. In 2019, his body was exhumed and a sample of flesh was taken from his remains, from which suitable DNA was extracted for laboratory research. In January 2020, he was officially tied via DNA evidence to the Maurer murder. DuPage County Police later stated that further DNA testing would be conducted with the aid of the Chicago Police Department, to determine whether Bruce Lindahl was involved in at least 10 other killings.

See also
 List of serial killers in the United States

References 

1953 births
1981 deaths
20th-century American criminals
Accidental deaths in Illinois
American electricians
American male criminals
American murderers of children
American rapists
American serial killers
American people convicted of drug offenses
Crime in Illinois
Deaths from bleeding
Male serial killers
People from St. Charles, Illinois
Violence against women in the United States